Alexander Cairncross may refer to:

Alexander Cairncross (bishop) (1637–1701), Archbishop of Glasgow
Alexander Cairncross (economist) (1911–1998), Scottish academic
Sandy Cairncross (Alexander Messent Cairncross, born 1948), epidemiologist